Südeifel is a Verbandsgemeinde ("collective municipality") in the district Bitburg-Prüm, in Rhineland-Palatinate, Germany. The seat of the Verbandsgemeinde is in Neuerburg. It was formed on 1 July 2014 by the merger of the former Verbandsgemeinden Irrel and Neuerburg.

The Verbandsgemeinde Südeifel consists of the following Ortsgemeinden ("local municipalities"):

 Affler 
 Alsdorf 
 Altscheid 
 Ammeldingen an der Our 
 Ammeldingen bei Neuerburg 
 Bauler 
 Berkoth 
 Berscheid 
 Biesdorf 
 Bollendorf 
 Burg 
 Dauwelshausen 
 Echternacherbrück 
 Eisenach 
 Emmelbaum 
 Ernzen 
 Ferschweiler 
 Fischbach-Oberraden 
 Geichlingen 
 Gemünd 
 Gentingen 
 Gilzem 
 Heilbach 
 Herbstmühle 
 Holsthum 
 Hommerdingen 
 Hütten 
 Hüttingen bei Lahr 
 Irrel 
 Karlshausen 
 Kaschenbach 
 Keppeshausen 
 Körperich 
 Koxhausen 
 Kruchten 
 Lahr 
 Leimbach 
 Menningen 
 Mettendorf 
 Minden 
 Muxerath 
 Nasingen 
 Neuerburg 
 Niedergeckler 
 Niederraden 
 Niederweis 
 Niehl 
 Nusbaum 
 Obergeckler 
 Peffingen 
 Plascheid 
 Prümzurlay 
 Rodershausen 
 Roth an der Our 
 Schankweiler 
 Scheitenkorb 
 Scheuern 
 Sevenig bei Neuerburg 
 Sinspelt 
 Übereisenbach 
 Uppershausen 
 Utscheid 
 Waldhof-Falkenstein 
 Wallendorf
 Weidingen 
 Zweifelscheid 

Verbandsgemeinde in Rhineland-Palatinate